"Hey, Ma" is a song recorded by American indie folk band Bon Iver. It was released on June 3, 2019, as the lead single from their fourth studio album, I, I through Jagjaguwar, alongside "U (Man Like)".

"Hey, Ma" was nominated for Record of the Year at the 62nd Annual Grammy Awards.

Production and release
"Hey Ma" was written and produced by frontman Justin Vernon with producers Brad Cook and BJ Burton. The track was also produced by frequent collaborator Chris Messina. In a segment with Apple Music, Vernon said about the process of creating the song:

In his contribution to the track, Jake Luppen of indie rock band Hippo Campus revealed that producer Ryan Olson asked him to help contributing on the track. "I was at his space one night, and after a few beers, he just had me play guitar on a bunch of tracks of his that he was working on, and one of them happened to be 'Hey Ma.' I had heard it earlier from BJ [Burton], and he obviously did the final mix, so BJ was the one who kept it in there, but I tracked it with Ryan," he added.

The song was written based on Vernon's childhood recollections and relation to his mother. Milan Polk of Vulture described the song was about "a reminder to 'call your ma'." Sean Lang of Consequence of Sound commented the chorus was about that "he has what he always wanted, yet contentment eludes him, and, wrapped up in the busyness of what his life has become, he knows he ought to call home."

The song was debuted live during their set at Bonnaroo Music Festival 2018. The studio version of the track was played following their headline set at All Points East music festival on June 2, 2019. The video was ended with the band's new website icommai.com, contained graphics similar to the track's lyrics video. According to the All Points East press release, the tracks would appear on the then-upcoming album, i, i.

Critical reception
The track received mostly positive reviews from critics. Writing for Spin, Will Gottsegen described the song as "all love and light" and compared it to the band's track "Flume". He wrote that the track "picks up where 'Flume' left off, straight-faced and humble, with an ode to the mother invoked so early in the Bon Iver canon." Sean Lang and Samantha Lopez of Consequence of Sound commended "Hey Ma" as the website's Track of the Week. Despite his mixed review for the associated album, Ben Beaumont-Thomas of The Guardian praised the song as one of the best Bon Iver tracks. "Its proper melody all the more tangible for coming after the mere simulacra before it; it has a subtle, powerful head-nod rhythm, and real bite to the scorn of its central lyric, 'full time you talk your money up / while it's living in a coal mine'," he added. Damien Morris of The Observer said that the peak of i, i happened somewhere around the heartstopping beauty of 'Hey, Ma's' drifting, wordless middle eight, a breakdown brimming with inarticulate emotion, barely understood, unmediated."

In a less positive review, Jeremy D. Larson of Pitchfork called the song "doesn't quite tower and crash like the best of Bon Iver, Bon Iver and it doesn't really lead you to places unknown, but it places you firmly in the increasingly defined world of Bon Iver: sensitive and dreamy, warm synths and a few saxophones, capturing the feeling of escaping the present for an idyllic past." Contradicting to Larson's single review, while writing the review for i, i, fellow Pitchfork writer Matthew Strauss called the track as "one of the best songs in the Bon Iver catalog" and described it as "rousing and explicitly sentimental."

Year-end lists
"Hey, Ma" was included on several year-end lists.

Personnel
BJ Burton – production, additional engineering, mixing
Greg Calbi – mastering
Brad Cook – production, bass
Zach Hanson – engineering, mixing
Zack Hernandez – engineering assistance
Ben Lester – CP-70 electric piano
Jake Luppen – guitar
Chris Messina – production, engineering, mixing
Brian Moen – drums
Jerry Ordonez – engineering assistance
Psymun – sampling
Alli Rogers – engineering assistance
Buddy Ross – synthesizers
Andrew Sarlo – additional engineering
Justin Vernon – vocals, production, guitar, Matrix 6
Jenn Wasner – vocals, guitar
Worm Crew – horns
Tim Albright – trombone
Hideaki Aomori – clarinets, alto saxophone
CJ Camerieri – trumpet, flugelhorn, French horn
Ross Garren – harmonica
Michael Lewis – tenor saxophone, soprano saxophone
Rob Moose – violin, viola, string arrangement, conductor
Randy Pingrey – trombone
Credits adapted from Bon Iver's official website.

Charts

References

2019 songs
2019 singles
Jagjaguwar singles
Bon Iver songs
Songs about childhood
Songs written by Justin Vernon
Songs written by BJ Burton